The C7 microprocessor from VIA Technologies is a seventh-generation CPU targeted at the consumer and embedded market.

Desktop processors

C7

"Esther"  (90 nm) 
 All models support: MMX, SSE, SSE2, SSE3, NX bit, VIA PadLock (SHA, AES, Montgomery Multiplier, RNG)
 VIA PowerSaver supported with 2 ACPI P-states

C7-D

"Esther" (90 nm) 
 All models support: MMX, SSE, SSE2, SSE3, NX bit, VIA PadLock (SHA, AES, Montgomery Multiplier, RNG)
 VIA PowerSaver supported on Model D 1.8 and 2.0 with 2 ACPI P-states

Mobile processors

C7-M

"Esther" (standard-voltage, 90 nm) 
 All models support: MMX, SSE, SSE2, SSE3, NX bit, VIA PadLock (SHA, AES, Montgomery Multiplier, RNG)
 VIA PowerSaver supported with up to 8 ACPI P-states

"Esther" (ultra-low-voltage, 90 nm) 
 All models support: MMX, SSE, SSE2, SSE3, NX bit, VIA PadLock (SHA, AES, Montgomery Multiplier, RNG)
 VIA PowerSaver supported with up to 8 ACPI P-states

External links 
 VIA C7 product page
 VIA C7-D product page
 VIA C7-M product page

See also
 List of VIA microprocessors

C7
VIA